Anthyperythra is a genus of moths in the family Geometridae described by Swinhoe in 1891.

Species
 Anthyperythra hermearia Swinhoe, 1891

References

Ourapterygini
Geometridae genera